Hitler is a 1962 black and white American film. The film stars Richard Basehart in the title role of Adolf Hitler; Cordula Trantow stars as Geli Raubal, Maria Emo as Eva Braun and John Banner as Gregor Strasser. The film depicts Hitler through the years, beginning with the Beer Hall Putsch of November 1923 and focuses mainly on his private life, in particular, his relationships with niece Geli and longtime companion/wife, Eva Braun. According to film critic and historian Leonard Maltin, Basehart "gives a cerebral interpretation" of Hitler during the timeframe he was the leader of Nazi Germany. For her performance, Cordula Trantow was nominated for a 1962 Golden Globe in the category: Most Promising Newcomer - Female. The film was produced by Three Crown Productions, Inc. and distributed by Allied Artists Pictures.

Cast

Home media
This film was released on DVD via the Warner Archive Collection.

See also
 List of American films of 1962

References

External links

1962 films
1960s biographical drama films
Allied Artists films
American war drama films
Films about Adolf Hitler
1960s English-language films
Films directed by Stuart Heisler
Films about Nazi Germany
Cultural depictions of Adolf Hitler
Cultural depictions of Eva Braun
Cultural depictions of Joseph Goebbels
Cultural depictions of Hermann Göring
Cultural depictions of Heinrich Himmler
Films scored by Hans J. Salter
1962 drama films
1960s American films